Matthew Marvin Jr.  (bapt. November 8, 1626 – 1712) was a founding settler of Norwalk, Connecticut. He served as a deputy of the General Assembly of the Colony of Connecticut from Norwalk in the sessions of May 1694, and May and October 1697.

He was the son of Matthew Marvin Sr. and Elizabeth.

He was twenty-four years old when he settled at Norwalk.

He is listed on the Founders Stone bearing the names of the founding settlers of Norwalk in the East Norwalk Historical Cemetery.

References 

1626 births
1712 deaths
American Puritans
Deputies of the Connecticut General Assembly (1662–1698)
People from Great Bentley
Founding settlers of Norwalk, Connecticut
Burials in East Norwalk Historical Cemetery